Kelabita is a small genus of southeast Asian cellar spiders. The genus was erected in 2018 for two species transferred from Pholcus after a molecular phylogenetic study of Pholcidae. It is named after the Kelabit, an ethnic group native to Borneo.

See also
 Pholcus
 List of Pholcidae species

References

Further reading
 

Pholcidae genera
Spiders of Asia